The Good Companions is a 1957 British musical film directed by J. Lee Thompson and starring Eric Portman. It is based on the 1929 novel of the same name by J. B. Priestley and is a remake of the 1933 film version.

Partial cast
 Eric Portman as Jess Oakroyd
 Celia Johnson as Miss Trant
 Hugh Griffith as Morton Mitcham
 Janette Scott as Susie Dean
 John Fraser as Inigo Jollifant
 Joyce Grenfell as Lady Parlitt
 Bobby Howes as Jimmy Nunn
 Rachel Roberts as Elsie and Effie Longstaff
 John Salew as Mr. Joe
 Mona Washbourne as Mrs. Joe
 Shirley Anne Field as Redhead
 Carole Lesley as Film star

Production
It was one of the pet projects of Robert Clark, head of ABPC. J Lee Thompson was Clark's favourite director.

Reception
In a House of Lords debate it was revealed the film had lost £118,382.

References

External links

1957 films
1950s romantic musical films
British romantic musical films
Remakes of British films
Films shot at Associated British Studios
Films directed by J. Lee Thompson
Films based on British novels
Films based on works by J. B. Priestley
Films set in London
Films set in Yorkshire
Films produced by J. Lee Thompson
1950s English-language films
1950s British films